The Alfa Romeo SZ (Sprint Zagato) or ES-30 (Experimental Sportscar 3.0 litre) is a high-performance limited-production sports car built between 1989 and 1991 by a partnership between Centro Stile Zagato, Centro Stile Alfa Romeo and Centro Stile Fiat. It was unveiled as the ES-30 at the 1989 Geneva Motor Show as a prototype by Zagato, although the car was mainly built by them - not designed mechanically.

Overview

The SZ was planned as an attempt to revive Alfa Romeo's sporting heritage after its acquisition by Fiat in 1986 and was developed to recall the  Alfa Romeo Giulietta Sprint Zagato from the late 1950s and early 1960s. A common misconception about the SZ is the car being designed by Zagato, but the car was designed in-house. Robert Opron of the Centro Stile Fiat was responsible for the initial sketches while Antonio Castellana was largely responsible for the final styling details and interior. Only the 'Z' logo of Zagato was kept on the design with the signature Zagato double bubble roof being absent. The car possessed unusual hexa headlights positioned in a trio on each side - a styling used more subtly on later Alfa Romeo models in the 2000s. The unusual design of the car can be attributed to the use of early CAD/CAM, or computer-aided design and manufacturing by Alfa Romeo.

Mechanically and engine-wise, the car was based on the Alfa Romeo 75, with production being carried out by Zagato at Terrazzano di Rho near the Alfa Romeo factory in Arese. The thermoplastic injection moulded composite body panels were produced by Italian company Carplast and French company Stratime Cappelo Systems.

The suspension was taken from the Alfa 75 group A/IMSA car, and modified by Giorgio Pianta, engineer and team manager of the Lancia and Fiat rally works team. A hydraulic damper system was made by Koni. The SZ was originally equipped with Pirelli P Zero tyres (front 205/55 ZR 16, rear 225/50 ZR 16). The car came without any driver's aids to provide a challenging experience to the drivers.

RZ
A convertible version of the SZ, the RZ (for Roadster Zagato), was produced from 1992 until December 1994. Although almost identical to look at, the two cars had completely different body panels save for the front wings and boot. The RZ had a revised bumper and door sills to give better ground clearance and the bonnet no longer featured the aggressive ridges. Three colours were available as standard including black, yellow and red, with black and yellow being the more popular choices. Yellow and red cars got a black leather interior and black cars burgundy. Although the interior layout was almost unchanged from the SZ, the RZ had a painted central console that swept up between the seats to conceal the convertible roof storage area. 350 units were planned but production was halted after 252 units when the Zagato factory producing the cars for Alfa Romeo went into receivership, a further 32 cars were then completed under the control of the receivers before production finished at 284 units. Of those, three RZs were painted silver with burgundy interior and the final RZ was painted pearlescent white.

Characteristics
Engine code: AR 61501
 SZ : Only one official colour scheme was available: Red with grey roof, Tan leather interior
 One SZ was made in black exterior colour for Andrea Zagato
 RZ : Only three official colour schemes were available: Red with Black leather, Yellow with Black leather, and Black with Red leather interior
 At the end of production, three RZs were made in silver and one in pearlescent white colours
 1,036 SZs were produced (planned production was 1,000), about 100 were exported to Japan.
 278 RZs were produced (planned production was 350)

Motorsport

SZ Trofeo 
The SZ Trofeo is a modified version of the SZ built for a single-model race series run on circuits throughout Europe, but primarily in Italy at venues such as Imola, Misano, and Mugello. Only 13 cars were built and it seems like most were finished in red, although at least one was black. Wheels are 16″ OZ three-piece items fitted with Pirelli tires, of which each team received three sets. The interior is largely stripped, but retains the dash and door panels, consistent with era regulations. The engine is largely identical to those used in road-going versions of the SZ and RZ, but with balanced internals and different tuning.

References

External links

A lot of information about the Alfa Romeo SZ and RZ by E v.d. Beek.

SZ
Rear-wheel-drive vehicles
Coupés
Roadsters
1990s cars
Cars introduced in 1989
Cars discontinued in 1994